The Ålesund Region is a metropolitan region in Møre og Romsdal county in western Norway.  It consists of a number of municipalities, centered on the city/municipality of Ålesund.

References

Metropolitan regions of Norway